The 1983 Kopaonik earthquake occurred on September 10 at 06:14 UTC with a body wave magnitude of 5.3 and a maximum Mercalli intensity of VIII (Severe). The epicenter was in the Kopaonik mountains of Serbia. It affected seven villages, leaving 200 homeless, and damaged 1,200 buildings and dwellings.

Kopaonik was hit five times by earthquakes of intensity VII to VIII between 1978 and 1985.

See also
List of earthquakes in 1983
1998 Mionica earthquake
2010 Serbia earthquake

References

Further reading 
 

Kopaonik earthquake
1983 Kopaonik earthquake
Kopaonik Earthquake, 1983
September 1983 events in Europe
1983 in Yugoslavia